Bettina Tietjen (* 5 January 1960 in Wuppertal) is a German television presenter and talkshow host.

Life 
Tietjen studied German studies, art history and Romance studies at University of Münster and in Paris. After university studies she worked as journalist at RIAS and then at NDR. From January 1997 to September 2007 she was together with Eva Hermann talk show host of Stargeflüster''' on NDR: Together with Eckart von Hirschhausen she is since September 2009 talk show host of Tietjen und Hirschhausen'' on German broadcaster Norddeutscher Rundfunk.

External links 
 German national library:Bettina Tietjen
 Internet Movie Database:Bettina Tietjen

References 

German television presenters
German women television presenters
German television talk show hosts
Mass media people from Wuppertal
Living people
1960 births
Norddeutscher Rundfunk people